Blacktop or asphalt concrete is a composite material used to surface roads. The word blacktop can also be used to refer directly to a paved road.

Blacktop or Black Top may also refer to:

 Black Top Records, a record label
 Blacktop Peak, a mountain in California
 Black Top, British Jazz duo of Orphy Robinson and Pat Thomas

See also
 Macadam, a type of road construction
 Tarmacadam, a road surfacing material of macadam surfaces, tar, and sand